John Hogan Gidley is an American political aide who served as White House Deputy Press Secretary from 2019 to 2020 in the Donald Trump administration. In July 2020, Gidley became the press secretary of President Donald Trump's re-election campaign.

Early life and career 
Gidley was born in El Dorado, Arkansas. He graduated from the University of Mississippi with a degree in broadcast journalism and a minor in political science in 1998. In college, Gidley was a member of the Young Republicans and of the Sigma Chi fraternity.

Career 
Gidley served as the director of Huck PAC. His past activities include director of media operations for Arkansas Governor Mike Huckabee, Executive Director of the South Carolina Republican Party, Press Secretary to the David Beasley for Senate campaign, the Karen Floyd for Superintendent of Education campaign, and U.S. Senator Elizabeth Dole's campaign committee. He was director of communications for Rick Santorum's 2012 presidential campaign.

Trump administration 
The Trump administration announced on October 10, 2017, that Gidley would serve as Deputy Press Secretary, and he started his job at the White House the next day.

In February 2018, Gidley said that Trump was speaking "tongue-in-cheek" when he said it was "treasonous" for Democrats not to applaud him during the State of the Union address. Later that February, after Special Counsel Mueller's investigation led to the indictments of a number of Russians for election interference, Gidley said that Democrats and the media had done more to create "chaos" in the United States than the Russian government.

In January 2019, Gidley was promoted to deputy press secretary, succeeding Raj Shah. In June 2019, he was considered a candidate for White House Press Secretary when Sarah Sanders announced she was stepping down from the role. Stephanie Grisham was named to the position, with Gidley continuing as deputy press secretary.

On September 5, 2019, Gidley and Grisham published an opinion piece in The Washington Times, "The Washington Post's lost summer". They asserted the Post had not reported on several Trump accomplishments, although the paper actually had reported on them. The piece linked to a Post story titled "Trump becomes first sitting president to set foot into North Korea" as the authors asserted the paper had not reported that event.

In June 2020, Gidley resigned as deputy press secretary to serve as the national press secretary of the Trump reelection campaign. He was succeeded as deputy press secretary by Brian R. Morgenstern, a former official in the United States Department of the Treasury.

In January 2021, after being asked by Fox's Bill Hemmer whether Donald Trump had been emasculated by his removal from social media, Gidley called Trump "the most masculine person to ever hold the White House."

References

External links 

Living people
University of Mississippi alumni
Public relations people
South Carolina Republicans
Trump administration personnel
People from El Dorado, Arkansas
1976 births